The Yanqing National Sliding Centre is a bobsleigh, luge, and skeleton track in Yanqing District, a suburban district in Beijing. Also known as “The House of Speed” this venue hosted the bobsleigh, luge, and skeleton events for the 2022 Winter Olympics. The track has 16 curves with different angles and slopes.

Events hosted 
 Bobsleigh at the 2022 Winter Olympics
 Luge at the 2022 Winter Olympics
 Skeleton at the 2022 Winter Olympics

References

Venues of the 2022 Winter Olympics
Bobsleigh, luge, and skeleton tracks
Olympic bobsleigh venues
Olympic luge venues
Olympic skeleton venues
Sports venues in Beijing
Sports venues completed in 2020
2020 establishments in China
Yanqing District